Pierce Davies Schenck (d. 15 October 1930, Dayton, Ohio) was an entrepreneur in the metalworking business in Dayton, Ohio. He used the garage behind his house on South Brown Street to work on automobiles and in April 1907 incorporated the Speedwell Motor Car Company. Speedwell purchased and occupied a former Dayton Machine Tool Company factory on Essex Avenue in Dayton's Edgemont neighborhood, a site that later hosted a Delco factory. The factory provided temporary space to the Wright Company in 1910 before the completion of its new airplane factory in west Dayton. The Great Dayton Flood of 1913 inundated the Speedwell factory, destroying machinery and automobiles, and the company proved unable to recover and entered receivership in 1915.  Schenck later became president of the Dayton Malleable Iron Company and turned his focus to adapting high silicon iron alloys to practical uses. This led to his establishing the Duriron Company, a name which he coined, in 1917. It prospered through high demand for its products generated by the First World War and employed 1,500 people, becoming one of Dayton's leading industries. His home at 414 Oakwood Avenue in Oakwood was designed by Dayton architect Albert Pretzinger in 1927.

References

Further reading
 Dalton, Curt, Roger L. Miller, Michael M. Self, and Ben F. Thompson, Miami Valley's Marvelous Motor Cars: From the Apple-Eight to the Xenia Cyclecar, 1886-1960 (n.p: n.p.: 2007), 35-36.

1930 deaths
American business executives
People from Oakwood, Montgomery County, Ohio
Metalworkers
Businesspeople from Dayton, Ohio
Year of birth missing